Rhodopsalta is a genus of cicada in the family Cicadidae. It is endemic to New Zealand.

Species
 Rhodopsalta cruentata (Fabricius, 1775) 
 Rhodopsalta leptomera (Myers, 1921)
 Rhodopsalta microdora (Hudson, 1936)

References

Cicadas of New Zealand
Endemic fauna of New Zealand
Cicadettini
Cicadidae genera
Endemic insects of New Zealand